Swantham Sujatha ( Yours Faithfully Sujatha) was a 2020 Indian Malayalam language television soap opera launched in  Surya TV on 16 November 2020 and ended on 12 March 2023. It also streams on YouTube and Sun NXT. Chandra Lakshman plays the titular character alongside Kishor Satya. Both returned to Malayalam television after a hiatus. This show was temporary stopped due to COVID-19 from May 21, 2021, and was relaunched on July 5, 2021.

Since its reception the serial is the top rated serial and became the first in TRP chart for month, unless at the starting of Kaliveedu serial.

From its reception the serial aired at 9:00 pm, but from 26 August 2021 onwards the serial aired from Monday to Saturday at 9:30 pm. then from 24 July the serial aired from Monday to Sunday 7:30pm. Then from 28 November the serial aired from Monday to Sunday at 6:00pm replacing Nethra serial. Due to its time change the serial lost its high viewer lost its TRP rating.

Plot
A happy home maker, who loves her family and cherishes her life. But her life turn into a roller coaster ride, when she finds her true calling as an RJ after being home bound for years.

Cast

Lead
Chandra Lakshman as Sujatha (Suja)  R.J. Swantham Sujatha: Prakashan's ex-wife; Aparna and Abhi's mother. A homemaker who lacks education and considers family as her world. She become an R.J. in Red FM after her divorce. (2020present)
Kishor Satya as Prakashan: Sujatha's ex-husband; Mahilamani Amma's son; Aparna and Abhi's father. He works at Future Solar group and get divorced from Sujatha because of his illegitimate relationship with Ruby. Again Prakshan marries Sujatha(2020present)
Anu Nair as Ruby: A divorcee and Sujatha's best friend who leads an illegal relationship with Prakashan, who is also her colleague at Future solar. (2020present)(Main Antagonist)

Recurring
Pria Menon as Manimangalath Mahilamani Amma: Prakashan's mother; Sujatha's mother-in-law. (2020present)
Swathikaa as Aparna (Appu): Sujatha and Prakashan's daughter. (2020present)
Manaved as Abhi: Sujatha and Prakashan's son. (2020present)
Tosh Christy as Adam John  Joekuttan: Advocate and youngest Son of Sara who helps Sujatha (2021–Present)
Amith as Chandran
PWD contractor, husband of Praseetha and Prakashan's brother-in-law
Gautham Praveen 
Son of Praseetha and Chandran, grand child of Mahilamaniamma
Gouri 
Elder daughter of Praseetha and Chandran, grand child of Mahilamaniamma
Jayakumar Parameswaran Pillai as Jayan
Sujatha's elder brother, husband of Latha
Sangeetha Shivan as Lathika 
Sujatha's sister-in-law, w/o of Jayan
Nitha Promy as Thara
Sujatha's elder sister
Pala Aravindan 
Father of Sujatha, Jayan and Thara
Usharani (Photo appearance)
Mother  of Sujatha, Jayan and Thara
Rashmi Jayagopal / Kavitha Lakshmi as Sara Aunty
Fan of RJ Sujatha, retired teacher, mother of Adam and owner of Jerusalem.
Yadhukrishnan as Avarachan
Adam's elder brother
Manju Shaji as Ambili
Sara aunty's domestic helper
Shemi Martin as ACP Ayisha Begum IPS
An Orphan, Adam's wife who later turns out to be City ACP
Murugan Panachumoodu as Murugesan
Domestic help cum best friend of Adam
Ponnus Anil as Chandana  Chandu
Abhi's crush in neighbourhood area
Harisree Martin
Boban Alummoodan as Sajith
Local goon and Ex-husband of Ruby (Second Husband)
Sandra Balan as Sandhya Rani
Kiran Raj as Circle Inspector Alex
Cherthala Lalitha as Molly Chechi
Sujatha's Neighbor
Landwin Crizz as Pranav
Appu's boyfriend, a spoilt brat
Vishnu Pillai as Vishnu
Illegal Drug businessman, friend of Pranav who tries to kidnap Appu
Nithul Vazhayil as Jijo
Pranav's best friend and Vishnu's secret keeper who tries to kidnap Appu
Devasurya as Veena
Program Coordinator of Swantham Sujatha/ Pranayapoorvam Sujatha on Red FM, who supports Sujatha
Jiffin George as Shivaranjini
 Project staff at Future solar group; subordinate of Ruby who hates her
Deepika Mohan as Dr.Mersykutty
Gynaecologist, personal doctor of Ruby
Manu Martin Pallippadan as Dr.Sevi Skariah
Physician, Veena's lover
Veena Santhosh as Adv.Reena Abraham
Ruby's close friend Junior Advocate to Yogiraj who handles ruby's divorce case
Ameya Nair as Adv.Ancy
Reena's colleague and leading advocate in high court, Swaminathan'a junior
Tony as Mukundan
Groom who wishes to Marry Sujatha
Manju Stanley as Suma, House Owner of Ruby
Ibrahim Kutty as Albert
Owner of a popular advertising agency
Ananya Kumari Alex as Sanju
Renowned makeup artist and friend of Veena who helps Appu from Ruby's Trafficking team.
Jeeshma K George as Anitha
HR manager of Future solar group who traps Ruby and Prakashan
Ambarish as Harihara Poduwal
Vasudevan's younger brother, Ruby's brother in law and IT professional
Ranju Lakshmi as Doctor
Anzil as Darshan
Sini Varghese
Darshana Das
Raji Menon
Nancy
Sreelekshmi Das as Chandana (Chandhu)
Ann rose
Joshy Mahatma as Aani Ashari

Cameo Appearance
Saiju Kurup as himself (Episode 137–140)
Co-actor of Sujatha in Heavely diamonds advertisement
Vinu Mohan as Director Vinu (Episode 137–138)
Director of Heavenly Diamonds advertisement
Sreeram Ramachandran as Vasudevan Poduwal (Episode 133–135)
 Ruby's First husband, a renowned temple artist based out of Palakkad who was cheated by Ruby 
Sruthi Lakshmi as Angel
 Joe's (Adam John) wife (dead) [Photo Presence]
Gayathri Varsha as Judge at Family Court
Santhosh Keezhattoor as Adv.Swaminathan (Episode 178–179)
Sadhika Venugopal as Adv.Sushma Omprakash (recurring)

Guest Appearance in Promo
Haritha G Nair
Manu Nair
Malavika Krishnadas
Krishna
Jeethu Joseph
Uma Nair
Shalu Menon
Vishnuprasad
Ajay Thomas
Sreedevi Anil
Binsa

Soundtrack

References

2020 Indian television series debuts
Malayalam-language television shows
Surya TV original programming